KNDC (1490 AM) is a radio station licensed to serve Hettinger, North Dakota. The station is owned by Schweitzer Media, Inc. It airs a Classic hits format.

The station was assigned the KNDC call letters by the Federal Communications Commission.

References

External links
 KNDC official website
 

NDC
Country radio stations in the United States
Radio stations established in 1954
Adams County, North Dakota